The  Turkmen State Institute of Physical Education and Sports (former National Institute of Sports and Tourism of Turkmenistan) is a sports-oriented university in Turkmenistan, offering training of specialists in the fields of tourism, hospitality and sports. 

Alladurdy Saryyev is the current rector.

Structure 
The colleges of the university are:
Sports
Tourism

Departments 
Sports medicine and biological support
International experience
Equestrian, gymnastics, athletics and swimming
Turkmen national and sport games
Goresh and martial arts
Organization and management of tourism
Hospitality management
Theory and methodology of sports and biomechanics

New building 
The new building was built by Bouygues Construction in Ashgabat. The Institute consists of a main 12-storey office tower flanked on the right and left by four-storey academic buildings, which house the auditorium, lecture halls, and a conference room. In the gymnasium are located on two floors volleyball, basketball, and handball courts, and mini football area. The new building of the university is designed to accommodate 1600 students.

References

External links 
 The National Institute of Sports and Tourism of Turkmenistan

Universities in Turkmenistan
1997 establishments in Turkmenistan
Education in Turkmenistan
Educational institutions established in 1997